Fereej Bin Omran is a district in Qatar, located in the municipality of Ad Dawhah. Together with New Al Hitmi and Hamad Medical City, it makes up Zone 37 which has a total population of 26,121.

Landmarks

Elite Medical Center on Al Jazira Al Arabiya Street.
Al Rawnaq Trading Complex on Ahmed Bin Ali Street.
Al Meera Supercenter on Al Awzaei Street.
Al Rayah Driving School was based in Fereej bin Omran until it relocated to Mesaimeer in October 2016. 
The TADDAC (Training and Development of Differently Abled Children) Centre is located in the district.

Transport
Mowasalat is the official transport company of Qatar and serves the community through its operation of public bus routes. Fereej Bin Omran is served by one bus line which departs from Al Ghanim Bus Station. Route 55 has stops at Fereej Bin Omran and Madinat Khalifa South and a terminus at Madinat Khalifa Bus Stop near the Immigration Department, running at a frequency of every 30 minutes on all days of the week.

References

Communities in Doha